Oakwood is a village in Oakwood Township, Vermilion County, Illinois, United States. It is part of the Danville, Illinois Metropolitan Statistical Area. The population was 1,595 at the 2010 census, and 1,507 in 2018.

Geography

History
The area where Oakwood currently is built was historically inhabited by Kickapoo and Potawatomi Native American tribe. The Potawatomi’s camp was located on the south side of Oakwood near the modern-day Lake Bluff trailer park. The Native also discovered the salts mines which would later become the start of the town’s economy.
In the early 1800s, fur trappers arrived in the area and drove the Native Americans into Missouri.

On 31 October 1819 an army surveyor team arrived in the region, The Team was composed of Captain Blackman, Remember Blackman, George Beckwith, Seymour Treat, Peter Allen, and Francis Whitcomb. The Team set up camp on the north side of Salt Fork Vermilion River on the modern-day southeast corner of Oakwood, where they set up a salt mine boiling off salty water from the ground. In 1824  John W. Vance would gain control of the mine and increase production however due to competition from other mines the mine eventually shut down and people moved out.

Between 1860-1865 a coal mine was opened, the mine was called Glenburn Coal Mine located about one and a half miles to the north, eventually, the mine shut down in 1898 and at least 5 of the house moved to the current city of Oakwood.

On 30 December 1997 a  pipe bomb exploded at the United Methodist Church located in the town killing Brian Plawer. The bomber named Richard White would commit another bombing in nearby Danville injuring 34 people. He would die by blowing himself up in the garage to avoid arrest.

Demographics

As of the census of 2000, there were 1,502 people, 621 households, and 435 families residing in the village. The racial makeup of the village was 99.33% White, 0.13% African American, 0.20% Native American, 0.07% Asian, and 0.27% from two or more races. Hispanic or Latino of any race were 0.53% of the population.

There were 621 households, out of which 34.3% had children under the age of 18 living with them, 52.3% were married couples living together, 14.0% had a female householder with no husband present, and 29.8% were non-families. 25.6% of all households were made up of individuals, and 13.5% had someone living alone who was 65 years of age or older. The average household size was 2.42 and the average family size was 2.87.

In the village, the population was spread out, with 26.5% under the age of 18, 8.3% from 18 to 24, 27.4% from 25 to 44, 24.8% from 45 to 64, and 13.0% who were 65 years of age or older. The median age was 36 years. For every 100 females, there were 92.1 males. For every 100 females age 18 and over, there were 82.5 males.

The median income for a household in the village was $41,477, and the median income for a family was $44,583. Males had a median income of $31,107 versus $23,320 for females. The per capita income for the village was $18,655. About 7.8% of families and 8.1% of the population were below the poverty line, including 11.5% of those under age 18 and 10.1% of those age 65 or over.

Notable people 

 Margaret W. Campbell was buried in the family plot in an Oakwood Cemetery
 Darrin Fletcher, catcher for several Major League Baseball teams.
 Bobby Pierce, racing driver on several national tours
 Angela Watson, actress (Step by Step)
 Cameron Lee, offensive lineman for several National Football League teams

Schools
Oakwood Grade School
Mascot: "Stars"
Oakwood Junior High School
Mascot: "Knights"
Oakwood High School
Mascot:"Comets"
Song: "Cheer, Cheer, for old Oakwood's fame. Wake up the echoes cheering her name.  Send the volley cheer on high. Shake down the thunder from the sky. What though the odds be great or small, old Oakwood High will win overall, while her loyal sons are marching onward to victory.  Repeat."

References 

Villages in Vermilion County, Illinois
Villages in Illinois